Among several forms historically adopted by the Spanish nobiliary colleges - such as corporations, confraternities, companies, and chivalric orders - are the military brotherhoods, such as the Noble Compañia de Ballesteros Hijosdalgo de San Felipe y Santiago, in English, the Noble Company of Knights Crossbowmen of Saint Philip and Saint James (the Less). The Noble Company was founded circa 1350 in the town of Alfaro (Castile, La Rioja, Spain). Membership in the Noble Company has always been considered a "positive act of nobility," creating or confirming the Knights Crossbowmen as hidalgos with "nobility of blood and arms."
The crossbow as a military and hunting weapon was already known by the Romans. After a relative dark period it came to have a preeminent place in the 11th century in European armories (consider its importance in the Hundred Years War) and for hunting wild game.

Noble Confraternity and weapons 
Medieval sources provide us the types of arrows they threw, with different uses and meanings—even stone bullets capable of getting through armor from a distance longer than 250 feet. It was used by knights and infantrymen near the end of the 12th century, specially in Southern Europe. In land and sea, in sieges, actions and battles, its victims have no number (note - King Richard of the House of Plantagenet's killing in 1199). In spite of the presence of such an effective weapon during medieval campaigns, the Catholic Church condemned its use between Christians in wars: already in 1097-1099 Pope Urban II had condemned it, and the 1139 Concile in Laterano confirmed its prohibition.

Kingdom of Navarre 

In the Kingdom of Navarre documental references to crossbowmen are very old. In the summer of 1280, after a serious dispute between the towns of Alfaro and Corella (regarding water sharing of the Alhama River), Corella residents while harvesting their fields, being afraid of the Alfarians. were protected by at least thirty five crossbowmen. They were paid for serving thirty days the amount of 2093 Pounds. That service was very appreciated, and distinguished with tax exemptions and even with nobiliary privileges. In 1362 Miguel Sánchez de Ursúa, lord of Ursúa, served as master of crossbowmen. In 1355 Infante Don Luis ordered the governor of Estella to repair the town ballisters, which were mentioned in 1438. Nowadays there are still several crossbow companies such as the Crossbowmen companies of San Vicente de la Sonsierra, San Millán (Álava) and Peñacerrada (that of Ávalos lasted until the 19th century and that of Marquínez (Álava) were rebuilt as the brotherhood of the Sacred Sacrament of Noble Crossbowmen.

Kingdom of Castilla and Leon 
In the kingdoms of Castilla and León the first notices about crossbowmen came from the reigns of Alfonso VIII and Alfonso IX, growing during the 13th century as an auxiliary corporation as well as military bodyguard regiments (as police or justices). Although since the days of King Don Sancho IV there appeared the office of lord crossbowman; it was during the reigns of Don Alfonso XI and Don Pedro I that the royal crossbowmen reached a significant rank in Court, having the offices of lord crossbowman and lord major crossbowman.  These titles were kept at least until the end of 15th century, when there were several lord major crossbowmen, foot crossbowmen and horse crossbowmen.

King's Crossbowmen 
During the 14th and 15th centuries are notices referring to the King's crossbowmen spreading into towns and villages and recruiting their inhabitants — a frustrated attempt to establish a territorial Militia and Police Corps.  Additionally, special attention was given to the crossbow troop of Madrid, and even more to the one hundred and fifty crossbowmen of Sevilla, who attained great privileges (headed by their Lieutenant Juan de Monsalve). This group had an important part in the conquest of Canary Islands in 1480 and in the Granada Campaign ten years later. After the Medieval Era, the troops served the Crown under the authority of a lord crossbowman.

The Noble Company of Knights Crossbowmen of Saint Philip and Saint James was founded in the 14th century.  During this period, the land was owned by the Kingdom of Navarre (Alfaro was a highly powerful fortress in front of Castilla):Alfaro was attacked by the pretendant Don Enrique de Trastamara's troops in 1367, by Infante Don Juan of Castilla in 1378, and later in 1430 by Pedro Fernández de Velasco, master steward of Don Juan II of Castilla). Although in those three times the castle remained, in the first and in the third the town was burned by Castilians. During that time there were maintained a company of noble crossbowmen whose privileges were recognized and confirmed by the courts of Castilla.

Protectors of the Confraternity
Although The Noble Company has always enjoyed the earthly Patronage and Protection of the Spanish Crown—and still does today—The Noble Company receives its divine protection and guidance from the Apostles, Saint Philip and Saint James the Less, whose feast day is in May. That and other ceremonies in June and November are celebrated in the church of Saint Francis. The Noble Company was ruled by a major, a steward and a secretary; the two first were yearly elected during the day of Saint John of Avila on May 10. The major was the lawful authority in charge of everything in relation to fees, punishments and penalties. In this matter he was compared to an ordinary major in that time and he was like a true Royal Justice. The steward was in charge of economic and administration services of the Company. He managed the organization of ceremonies and reunions. He was also in charge of the surveillance of the communal fields.  This work was of great importance. The secretary, a secondary charge, managed only the Noble Company books and documents.

The crossbowmen were noblemen and had to be married to ladies of equal rank. To belong to the Noble Company was proof of nobility. All knights were obligated to assist in the corporative and municipal ceremonies and to guard the communal fields.

The Confraternity in the 21st century
Although the Noble Company has had a continuous existence since its inception in the 14th century—as confirmed by several governmental, notarial, and archdiocesan records—the Noble Company was officially registered with the Gobierno de Rioja in 1999; its revised, modernized statutes were approved in April 2004. Under the command of the President-Alcaide, Don Alfonso Ceballos-Escalera y Gila, Marqués de La Floresta, the Noble Company keeps the military tradition. Knights are obliged to acquire skill enough to manage his weapon each time they meet, especially every time they meet to pray. Each member is also expected to pledge fealty to the President-Alcaide by sending him a good bottle of wine at Christmas.

There are two classes of membership: Ballestero de Plaza and Ballestero de Hermandad. The former is reserved for residents of Rioja and its environs while the latter is for all others. As noted on the petition for admission, all members must be Catholic men who are: (a) at least twenty (20) years of age, (b) armigerous (with their arms duly registered in Spain), (c) possess nobility in the male line, and (d) if married, they are validly so (according to the Catholic Church) to women of good breeding. By virtue of their admission, members of the Noble Company receive the honorific Don for themselves and their male descendants (who will inherit and transmit the member's armorial bearings). The members' wives and female descendants are referred to as Doña. Economic life of the Noble Company depends on the members’ passage (initiation) fees.

Today members of the Confraternity are present in Spain, the UK, the USA, Germany, Ireland, Croatia, Italy and Finland.

Major Officers of the Confraternity

 Royal Protector and Honorary Chief: SM Don Juan Carlos I of Spain
 Chief: SAR the Prince Alvaro de Bourbon Duque de Galliera
 Commander: Alfonso Ceballos-Escalera y Gil, Marqués de La Floresta

References 
Noble Compañía de Ballesteros Hijosdalgo de San Felipe y Santiago: establecida en Alfaro : (oficio y exención de la ballestería navarra y castellana) Noble Company Ballesteros Hijosdalgo San Felipe and Santiago: Alfaro by J. Fernando Agudo Sanchez del Toro, Alfonso de Ceballos-Escalera y Gila and Isabel Álvarez González. 2006. .

External links 
 http://www.compania-ballesteros-hijosdalgo.eu/

Christian organisations based in Spain
Cultural organisations based in Spain